This is the complete list of women's medalists at the IAAF World Indoor Championships.

Current program

60 metres

400 metres

800 metres

1500 metres

3000 metres

60 metres hurdles

4 × 400 metres relay

High jump

Pole vault

Long jump

Triple jump

Shot put

Pentathlon

Discontinued events

200 metres

3000 metres walk

References

Results
IAAF World Indoor Championships archive

Indoor women
Indoor medalists
 List